Papa Dadson Ekow (born 18 March 1990) is a Ghanaian footballer who plays in Italy for A.C. Lumezzane.

Club career
Ahead of the 2019–20 season, Dadson returned to A.C. Lumezzane for the third time.

References

External links

1990 births
Living people
Ghanaian footballers
Ghanaian expatriate footballers
Association football midfielders
F.C. Lumezzane V.G.Z. A.S.D. players
U.S. Darfo Boario S.S.D. players
A.C. Trento 1921 players
Serie C players
Serie D players
Ghanaian expatriate sportspeople in Italy
Expatriate footballers in Italy